Koszanowo may refer to the following places:
Koszanowo, Kościan County in Greater Poland Voivodeship (west-central Poland)
Koszanowo, Szamotuły County in Greater Poland Voivodeship (west-central Poland)
Koszanowo, Kuyavian-Pomeranian Voivodeship (north-central Poland)
Koszanowo, West Pomeranian Voivodeship (north-west Poland)